Grevillea papuana is a tree species in the family Proteaceae. It is endemic to New Guinea. The species was formally described in 1916 by German botanist Ludwig Diels.

References

papuana
Flora of New Guinea
Plants described in 1916
Endemic flora of New Guinea